Bishnu Malakar (born 9 November 1959) is a Nepalese boxer. He competed in the men's light welterweight event at the 1980 Summer Olympics.

References

External links
 

1959 births
Living people
Nepalese male boxers
Olympic boxers of Nepal
Boxers at the 1980 Summer Olympics
Place of birth missing (living people)
Light-welterweight boxers